Brian Sheridan (born October 13, 1975) is an American Paralympic cyclist. In 2016, he represented the United States at the Summer Paralympics held in Rio de Janeiro, Brazil and he won the bronze medal in the men's road time trial H2 event. In 2015, he won one gold medal and one silver medal in cycling at the Parapan American Games held in Toronto, Canada.

References

External links 
 

Living people
1975 births
Sportspeople from Bay City, Michigan
Paralympic medalists in cycling
Paralympic bronze medalists for the United States
Medalists at the 2016 Summer Paralympics
Cyclists at the 2016 Summer Paralympics
Medalists at the 2015 Parapan American Games